The 12779 / 12780 Goa Express is a daily superfast train run by Indian Railways connecting Vasco da Gama and Hazrat Nizamuddin in New Delhi. It is one of the high priority superfast trains of Indian Railways and additionally, a very important train for Hubli division of South Western Railway.

This train is similar to trains like Karnataka Express, Telangana Express and Andhra Pradesh Express amongst others in providing convenient link between respective state capitals and New Delhi. Vasco da Gama (IR Code: VSG) is the nearest railhead to the capital of Goa, Panjim. Panjim is not directly accessible by rail.

History
The train was introduced around 1987.
At the time of introduction, rail links into Goa were Meter Gauge. Hence the train ran with a Broad Gauge and a Meter Gauge counterpart, the MG section between Vasco da Gama and Miraj, and the BG section between Miraj and Hazrat Nizamuddin. At the time of introduction the train was numbered 2479/2480, with maintenance in Delhi Railway Division of Northern Railway. Post gauge-conversion when the BG train ran the entire route, the train's maintenance was transferred to the Hubli Railway Division of the present day South Western Railway, and renumbered as 12779/12780.

Route
Goa Express was introduced long before Konkan Railways became operational. Thus the train routes via, Margao, Londa, Belgaum, Miraj, Sangli, Satara, Pune, Daund, Manmad, Bhusawal, Khandwa, Itarsi, Bhopal, Jhansi, Gwalior, Agra and Mathura .

During its 39-hour-25-minute journey traversing a distance of about 2202 km, the train passes through Karnataka, Maharashtra, Madhya Pradesh, Uttar Pradesh, Haryana and passes through a small portion of Rajasthan at Dhaulpur without stopping.

The train is the only daily passenger express train to pass through the Dudhsagar Falls on the Braganza Ghat section. Also 12779 provides a good opportunity to passengers to enjoy the natural beauty of Goa en route and enjoy the scenic Vasco Da Gama to Londa Junction rail route.

Accommodations
This train comprises 2 AC 2-Tiers, 4 AC 3-Tiers, 11 Sleeper Class, 3 Unreserved General Compartment, 1 Pantry car, 2 Luggage/Parcel cum Brake van which is provided with the Guards' cabin & RMS[Railway Mail Service]. Total coach composition is 23 coaches.

Loco Link

Both trains uses a Diesel and Electric Locomotives given below;

1. Vasco da Gama to Pune Junction a WDP-4D diesel locomotive from Pune Loco Shed .

2. Pune Junction to Hazrat Nizamuddin a WAP-7 electric locomotive from Tughlakabad Loco Shed.

Time Table

Direction Reversal 
Train Reverses its direction 2 times
 Londa Junction
 Pune Junction

Train no longer reverses it's direction at Daund after completion of the new Chord line.

See also 
 Trains of SWR
 Goa Sampark Kranti Express

References

External links 
 Goa Express Forum at Indian Rail Info
 Goa Express Route Map & Time-Table

Transport in Vasco da Gama, Goa
Transport in Delhi
Named passenger trains of India
Express trains in India
Rail transport in Goa
Rail transport in Uttar Pradesh
Rail transport in Madhya Pradesh
Rail transport in Maharashtra
Rail transport in Karnataka
Rail transport in Delhi